BC Horizont is a Belarusian women's basketball club from Minsk region. Most recently it has won the 2015 national championship and the 2020 national cup. 

It has appeared in the Ronchetti Cup (1993, 1994) and the FIBA EuroCup.

2022-23 squad
  Adrianna Webb (1.78)
  Irena Vrancic (1.65)
  Yulia Rytsikava (1.80)
  Olga Ziuzkova (1.71)
  Natallia Anufrienko (1.74)
  Maria Trafimenkava (1.67)
  Viktoryia Hasper (1.93)
  Yanina Inkina (1.86)
  Anastasiya Veremeenko (1.95)
  Yana Lebedich (1.88)

References

Women's basketball teams in Belarus
Basketball teams established in 2010